Dana Abad (Danabad) is a village in Jaranwala Tehsil, Faisalabad District, Punjab, Pakistan.

It is featured in the Punjabi folklore of Mirza Sahban. Mirza, the hero of this folklore, was born in this village. Dana Abad is home to Kharal Jats. The Mirza Sahiban Mausoleum is located in the village.

Transportation
Dana Abad is 11 km from Jaranwala city on Jaranwala-Syedwala road near M3 motorway (Pakistan) interchange.

References

Villages in Faisalabad District